Samuel Shashoua (born 13 May 1999) is an English professional footballer who plays for Spanish club CD Tenerife as an attacking midfielder.

Club career
Shashoua was born in Chelsea, London where he attended Harrow School before signing with Tottenham Hotspur in 2015. On 26 August 2018, he moved to Spanish Segunda División B side CD Atlético Baleares on a one-year loan deal.

Shashoua made his senior debut on 9 September 2018, playing the last 18 minutes of a 2–1 away loss against SD Ejea. He scored his first goal late in the month by netting the opener in a 2–1 home defeat of UB Conquense, and finished the campaign with six goals in 33 appearances as his side missed out promotion in the play-offs.

On 23 August 2019, Shashoua was sold to CD Tenerife in Segunda División, and signed a three-year contract with the club. The following 14 January, after failing to make an appearance due to an injury, Shashoua was again loaned to Atlético Baleares for the remainder of the season. He only recovered in March, and played in three matches for ATB as the club missed out promotion in the play-offs for a second consecutive year.

Shashoua made his professional debut on 19 September 2020, replacing Bruno Wilson late into a 0–2 away loss against AD Alcorcón. On 29 November, again from the bench, he scored his first goal in a 2–0 win at Albacete Balompié.

Personal life
Born in England, Shashoua is of Venezuelan and Spanish descent. His mother is half-Spanish. Shashoua said that he would apply for a Spanish passport at the end of the 2020–21 season.

Shashoua's younger brother Armando is also a footballer and a midfielder; both played together for Atlético Baleares in 2020.

References

External links

1999 births
Footballers from Chelsea, London
English footballers
English people of Venezuelan descent
English people of Spanish descent
English people of American descent
English people of Egyptian descent
Association football midfielders
Tottenham Hotspur F.C. players
Segunda División players
Segunda División B players
CD Atlético Baleares footballers
CD Tenerife players
English expatriate footballers
English expatriate sportspeople in Spain
Expatriate footballers in Spain
People educated at Harrow School
Living people